In number theory, the Erdős–Moser equation is

The only known solution is 11 + 21 = 31, and Paul Erdős conjectured that no further solutions exist.

Constraints on solutions 

Leo Moser in 1953 proved that, in any further solutions, 2 must divide k and that m ≥ 101,000,000.

In 1966, it was shown that 6 ≤ k + 2 < m < 2k.

In 1994, it was shown that lcm(1,2,...,200) divides k and that any prime factor of m + 1 must be irregular and > 10000.

Moser's method was extended in 1999 to show that m > 1.485 × 109,321,155.

In 2002, it was shown that all primes between 200 and 1000 must divide k.

In 2009, it was shown that 2k / (2m – 3) must be a convergent of ln(2); large-scale computation of ln(2) was then used to show that m > 2.7139 × 101,667,658,416.

References 

Diophantine equations
Moser equation
Unsolved problems in number theory